This article records new taxa of fossil plants that are scheduled to be described during the year 2020, as well as other significant discoveries and events related to paleobotany that are scheduled to occur in the year 2020.

Flowering plants

Alismatales

Apiales

Arecales

Buxales

Caryophyllales

Chloranthales

Cornales

Crossosomatales

Cucurbitales

Ericales

Fabales

Fagales

Garryales

Gentianales

Icacinales

Lamiales

Laurales

Liliales

Magnoliales

Malpighiales

Malvales

Myrtales

Nymphaeales

Oxalidales

Poales

Proteales

Ranunculales

Rosales

Sapindales

Saxifragales

Solanales

Trochodendrales

Vitales

Other angiosperms

Pinales

Other seed plants

Other plants

General research 
 A study on the evolutionary history of green plants is published by Nie et al. (2020).
 Description of new fossil material of Yurtusia uniformis from the Cambrian Yanjiahe Formation (China) and a study on the phylogenetic relationships and possible life cycle of this organism is published by Shang et al. (2020), who consider Y. uniformis to be a likely green microalga.
 A study on the phylogenetic relationships of extant and fossil complex thalloid liverworts (Marchantiidae) is published by Flores et al. (2020).
 Evidence of development of dichotomous roots in euphyllophytes that were extant during the Devonian and Carboniferous periods is presented by Hetherington, Berry & Dolan (2020), who interpret their findings as indicating that dichotomous root branching evolved in both lycophytes and euphyllophytes.
 An early land plant producing multiple spore size classes is described from the Lower Devonian Campbellton Formation (Canada) by Bonacorsi et al. (2020).
 A study on the impact of the appearance and evolution of herbivorous tetrapods on the evolution of land plants from the Carboniferous to the Early Triassic is published by Brocklehurst, Kammerer & Benson (2020).
 A study on the production of periderm in Late Paleozoic arborescent lycopsids is published by D'Antonio & Boyce (2020), who argue that these lycopsids did not grow from sporelings into large trees through the production of a periderm cylinder, because physiological limitations would have prohibited the production of thick periderm.
 A study on the architecture and development of the Carboniferous arborescent lycopsid Paralycopodites is published by DiMichele & Bateman (2020).
 New information on the anatomy of Weichselia reticulata is presented by Blanco‐Moreno, Decombeix & Prestianni (2020).
 A study on the phylogenetic placement of the extinct fern genus Coniopteris is published by Li et al. (2020).
 New information on the morphology of Paleoazolla patagonica is presented by Benedetti et al. (2020), who evaluate the implications of this taxon for the knowledge of the evolution of water ferns.
 A study aiming to determine which ferns were most likely to be the producers of Cyathidites spores from earliest Paleocene plant localities across western North America, and were most likely to be among the first plants in western North America to thrive in the immediate aftermath of the Cretaceous–Paleogene extinction event, is published by Berry (2020).
 A study on the morphology and development of Genomosperma, and on its implications for the knowledge of the evolutionary origins of seed development, is published by Meade, Plackett & Hilton (2020).
 A pollen organ resembling seed fern pollen organs Dictyothalamus and Melissiotheca is described from the Lopingian Umm Irna Formation (Jordan) by Zavialova et al. (2020), who interpret this finding as evidence of persistence of lyginopterid seed ferns until the late Permian.
 Evidence of increasing atmospheric CO2 concentration at the onset of the end-Triassic extinction event, based on data from fossil leaves of the seed fern Lepidopteris ottonis from southern Sweden, is presented by Slodownik, Vajda & Steinthorsdottir (2020), who confirm L. ottonis as a valid proxy for pCO2 reconstructions.
 A study on the anatomy of the seed cone scales of Krassilovia mongolica is published by Herrera et al. (2020), who argue that K. mongolica and Podozamites harrisii are the seed cones and leaves of the same extinct plant, and name a new family Krassiloviaceae within the order Voltziales.
 A study on the microscopic wood anatomy of a fossil tree trunk of Agathoxylon arizonicum with the characteristic external features of a fire scar from the Upper Triassic Chinle Formation (Petrified Forest National Park, Arizona, United States) is published by Byers et al. (2020), who evaluate the implications of this specimen for the knowledge of the evolution of fire-adapted plant traits.
 A putative bamboo "Chusquea" oxyphylla from the early Eocene Laguna del Hunco biota (Argentina) is reinterpreted as a conifer by Wilf (2020), who transfers this species to the genus Retrophyllum.
 A study on evolutionary history of conifers as indicated by fossil and molecular data, aiming to determine whether the rise of angiosperms drove the decline of conifers and other gymnosperms, is published by Condamine et al. (2020).
 Presence of secretory tissues is reported in extinct flowers from the Cretaceous amber from Myanmar and Cenozoic Dominican amber (including specimens preserved while in the process of emitting compounds) by Poinar & Poinar (2020).
 Fossil pollen of flowering plants is reported from the Aptian and Albian of Australia by Korasidis & Wagstaff (2020), who evaluate the implications of their findings for the knowledge of the timing of the appearance and diversification of the flowering plants in the high-latitude southern basins of Australia.
 A study on the morphology of palm and palm-like pollen from the Eocene Yaw Formation (Myanmar), and on the implications of these fossils for the knowledge of distribution and diversity of Eocene palms across the globe, is published by Huang et al. (2020).
 Fossils fruits of Illigera eocenica, representing the second fossil occurrence of Illigera worldwide and the first in Asia, are described from the Eocene Niubao Formation (central Tibetan Plateau) by Wang et al. (2020), who evaluate the implications of this finding for the knowledge of the climate in the central Tibetan Plateau during the early middle Eocene, and for the knowledge of the floristic links between Asia and North America during the Paleogene.
 A study on the morphology and phylogenetic relationships of Montsechia vidalii is published by Gomez et al. (2020).
 Eocene leaves of members of the family Urticaceae with stinging trichomes are described from the Okanogan Highlands (British Columbia, Canada) by DeVore et al. (2020).
 A revision of the fossil record of the family Nothofagaceae from South America is published by Pujana et al. (2020).
 A study on the extinction of plants from south polar terrestrial ecosystems during the Permian–Triassic extinction event and on their recovery after this extinction event, based on data from the Sydney Basin (Australia), is published by Mays et al. (2020).
 A study on the impact of ecological disturbances around the Permian–Triassic boundary (from the Wuchiapingian to Ladinian) on land plant communities is published by Nowak, Vérard & Kustatscher (2020).
 A study on the age of the Paleogene Kanaka Creek fossil flora (Huntingdon Formation; British Columbia, Canada) and on its implications for reconstructions of the contemporaneous paleoclimate and paleoenvironment is published by Mathewes, Greenwood & Love (2020).
 Evidence from Eocene plant fossils from the Bangong-Nujiang suture indicating that the Tibetan Plateau area hosted a diverse subtropical ecosystem approximately 47 million years ago and that this area was both low and humid at the time is presented by Su et al. (2020), who also report that the composition of this flora is similar to Early-Middle Eocene floras in both North America and Europe, but shows little affinity to Eocene floras from the Indian Plate.
 A study aiming to estimate leaf dry mass per area in fossil plants from 22 western North American sites spanning the Eocene–Oligocene transition is published online by Butrim & Royer (2020), who evaluate the implications of their findings for the knowledge of the impact of the environmental changes occurring during the Eocene–Oligocene transition on leaf‐economic strategies of plants.
 A study on the Neogene paleobotanical record and climate in the northernmost part of the Central Andean Plateau, based on data from the Descanso Formation (Peru), is published by Martínez et al. (2020), who report the earliest evidence of a puna-like ecosystem in the Pliocene and a montane ecosystem without modern analogs in the Miocene.
Fossil fruits (mericarps) of the neoendemic Apiaceae Melanoselinum (≡ Daucus) decipiens were reported from the lacustrine and fluvial sediments of Porto da Cruz, Madeira, dated 1.3 Ma, by Góis-Marques et al. 2020. This paper not only reports the oldest Daucus s.l. fossil known to date but also the first fossil evidence of a plant with insular woodiness (see Island gigantism).
The leaf fossil Mesodescolea plicata from the Early Cretaceous of Patagonia, first interpreted as a cycad with affinities with extant Stangeria, is reinterpreted as an angiosperm leaf with affinities with Austrobaileyales or Chloranthales by Coiro et al. 2020, with implications for the evolution of leaf shape in the early radiation of the angiosperms.
 A study on the phylogenetic relationships of 10 Cretaceous flower taxa (Chloranthistemon endressii, Dakotanthus cordiformis, Kajanthus lusitanicus, Mauldinia mirabilis, Microvictoria svitkoana, Paleoclusia chevalieri, Paradinandra suecica, Spanomera mauldiniensis, Tylerianthus crossmanensis and Virginianthus calycanthoides) is published by Schönenberger et al. (2020).

References 

2020 in paleontology
Paleobotany